Moelleriopsis messanensis is a species of sea snail, a marine gastropod mollusk unassigned in the superfamily Seguenzioidea.

Description
The size of the shell varies between 1.6 mm and 2.4 mm.

Distribution
This species occurs in the Mediterranean Sea.

References

 Gofas, S.; Le Renard, J.; Bouchet, P. (2001). Mollusca, in: Costello, M.J. et al. (Ed.) (2001). European register of marine species: a check-list of the marine species in Europe and a bibliography of guides to their identification. Collection Patrimoines Naturels, 50: pp. 180–213

External links
 

messanensis
Gastropods described in 1876